The Dorsai Companion is a collection of science fiction stories by American writer Gordon R. Dickson, part of his Childe Cycle series.  It was first published by Ace Books in 1986.  The collection includes a number of articles by Sandra Miesel.

Contents

 Introduction: See a Thousand Years
 Stars of the Childe Cycle: Mercator Projection, by Sandra Miesel
 Worlds of the Childe Cycle, by Sandra Miesel
 The Morgans, by Sandra Miesel
 The Graemes, by Sandra Miesel
 Chronology of the Childe Cycle, by Sandra Miesel
 "Amanda Morgan"
 "Warrior"
 "Lost Dorsai"
 "Brothers"
 When Your Contract Takes You to the Dorsai World, by Sandra Miesel

References

1986 short story collections
Short story collections by Gordon R. Dickson
Ace Books books